Alan Chambers (14 January 1904 – 1981) was a Canadian businessman and politician. Chambers was a Liberal party member of the House of Commons of Canada.

Born in England, he was an exporter, importer and merchant by career. He was first elected to Parliament at the Nanaimo riding in the 1935 general election after an earlier unsuccessful attempt to win a seat there in 1935. After serving one term in the House of Commons, Chambers was defeated by George Pearkes of the Progressive Conservatives in the 1945 election.

Chambers became the European chief of the Department of Veterans Affairs after World War II where he worked for the remainder of his career.

He died in 1981.

References

External links
 

1904 births
1981 deaths
Canadian merchants
English expatriates in Canada
Liberal Party of Canada MPs
Members of the House of Commons of Canada from British Columbia